Ryan James Eggold (born August 10, 1984) is an American actor. He is known for playing Ryan Matthews on the CW teen drama series 90210 and Tom Keen on the NBC crime drama series The Blacklist and its short-lived spin-off series The Blacklist: Redemption. Eggold appeared as hospital director Dr. Max Goodwin, a main character on the NBC drama series New Amsterdam, which began in September 2018 and ended in January 2023.

Early life and education
Eggold was born in Lakewood, California, the son of Karen (née Benik) and James Frederick Eggold. He is of German, Croatian, and Austrian-Jewish descent. Eggold graduated from Santa Margarita Catholic High School in 2002, where he participated in many school theater performances, and later from the University of Southern California's theater arts department in 2006.

Career
In 2006, Eggold made his professional television debut by way of a guest appearance on the show Related. He made his film debut the same year in the short film Con: The Corruption of Helm.

Eggold had recurring roles on CBS's The Young and the Restless, HBO's Entourage, Cartoon Network's Out of Jimmy's Head, ABC's Brothers & Sisters, and the UPN/CW series Veronica Mars, before obtaining his first series regular role on the FX's Dirt.

Eggold made his professional stage debut in the 2006 Ahmanson Theatre/Center Theatre Group production Dead End, directed by Nick Martin, and has since appeared in productions of Leipzig, the LA Weekly Theater Award–winning production of Marat/Sade, and an original production titled Amy and Elliot which he wrote, directed, and starred in at the Stella Adler Theatre with Alexandra Breckenridge.

Eggold portrayed English teacher Ryan Matthews in 90210, the CW spin-off of FOX's Beverly Hills, 90210. In January 2012, he played Mischa Barton's love interest in Mark Edwin Robinson's supernatural romance thriller Into the Dark. From 2013 to 2017, he regularly appeared as Tom Keen, a main character on the NBC drama The Blacklist. In January 2015, Eggold appeared on the History Channel's three-night miniseries Sons of Liberty as Dr. Joseph Warren, a friend of Sam Adams and Paul Revere.

In 2017, Eggold made a guest appearance on the second episode of Top Gear America.

Since 2018, Eggold has played Dr. Max Goodwin in the NBC series New Amsterdam. Most recently, he had started Analog A Productions, with a first-look deal at Universal Television, with Kara Frias named head of development for his new production company.

Personal life
Eggold was previously in a relationship with Twilight actress Ashley Greene.

Eggold writes music, plays guitar and piano, and sings in the band Eleanor Avenue.

Filmography

References

External links

 
 Ryan Eggold at The CW

1984 births
Living people
21st-century American male actors
American male film actors
American male soap opera actors
American male television actors
Male actors from Los Angeles County, California
People from Lakewood, California
USC School of Dramatic Arts alumni